= David Bedok =

French footballer (born 1984)

David Bedok דוד בידוק
Personal information
- Date of birth: 31 March 1984 (age 42)
- Place of birth: Lyon, France
- Height: 1.77 m (5 ft 10 in)

Senior career*
Years	Team	Apps	(Gls)
2004–2008	FC Gueugnon		
2008	Maccabi Herzliya	5	(0)
- * Club domestic league appearances and goals

David "Devy" Bedok (Hebrew: דוד "דבי" בידוק; born 31 March 1984) is a French former professional footballer.
